Kelvin Kinikanwo Wachukwu is a Nigerian engineer who served as Rivers State Commissioner of Works from December 2015 to April 2016. He was suspended indefinitely from office for negligence, dereliction of duty, particularly his failure to supervise projects effectively. He was replaced by Harrison B. Iheanyichukwu on 9 May 2016.

See also
Wike Executive Council
List of people from Rivers State

References

Commissioners of ministries of Rivers State
Engineers from Rivers State
First Wike Executive Council
Rivers State Commissioners of Works
Living people
Year of birth missing (living people)